Seventh Dagger Records is an independent record label releasing primarily hardcore and metalcore albums. It was founded in 2001 by Daniel "Sober" Trudel and is based in Creedmoor, North Carolina, USA.

Formed as a clothing company, Seventh Dagger became popular for its straight edge apparel and "Kill Your Local Drug Dealer" shirts.

Seventh Dagger Fest
The first annual Seventh Dagger Fest was held on 24 and 25 May 2008 at The Mad Hatter in Covington, Kentucky. The two-day event featured Seventh Dagger bands such as Rhinoceros, Eyes To The Sky, xTyrantx, xAFBx, Birth Of A Hero and The World We Knew as well as other well-known straight edge bands like Thick As Blood and Suicide Pact.

Distribution
In September 2007, Seventh Dagger signed a deal for physical and digital distribution with East West via Warner Bros Distribution. Seventh Dagger later pulled out of the deal and released the following statement...

"Why would we end that is what you would probably ask? The answer is simple, Seventh Dagger is something I have worked on for the last almost 7 years and I saw this deal being the end of the label as it was and is. I saw this as trading the underground status and soul of the label for the potential to sell more CDs and let's face it if I was here to make money I would have left a long time ago. Being a straight edge, hardcore record label is the epitome of being underground or cult and the truth of the matter is that is where we should be. Straight edge is not for the masses and it never will be, so as I see it we might have made a minor buzz for a minute then the world would move on and not give a shit and we would have been tied to some corporate distribution that I am sure could [sic] have cared less about us."

Seventh Dagger currently distributes through several well-known distributors, including Hot Topic, Interpunk.com, Very Distribution, RevHQ.com, Smartpunk.com, and their own website SeventhDagger.com.

Artists

 Blade
 Blackout Rage
 The Dead Man's Chest
 Domestic War
 Eyes To The Sky
 Ghost Ship
 One X Choice
 Parasitic Skies
 xRepresentx
 Search Bloc
 No X Zodiac

Past artists

 Barcadia
 xAFBx
 Awaken Demons
 Birth Of A Hero
 xBishopx
 Cherem
 Conqueror
 xCool Your Jetsx
 Earth Crisis
 In This Defiance 
 The Miles Between
 No Zodiac 
 Prayer For Cleansing
 Rhinoceros
 xThe Warx
 xTyrantx
 The World We Knew
 The Wrath

See also 
 List of record labels

References

External links
 Official web site

American independent record labels
Heavy metal record labels
Alternative rock record labels